Saxer Avenue station is SEPTA Route 101) trolley stop in Springfield Township, Delaware County, Pennsylvania. It is located near Saxer Avenue and Rolling Road.

Trolleys arriving at this station travel between 69th Street Terminal in Upper Darby, Pennsylvania and Orange Street in Media, Pennsylvania.  The station has a shed with a roof on the south side of the tracks where people can go inside when it is raining. No parking or bus service is available at this stop. While the south side of the tracks contain local businesses on Saxer Avenue, the north side is almost entirely residential.

Station layout

External links

 Station from Saxer Avenue from Google Maps Street View

SEPTA Media–Sharon Hill Line stations